The 1989 Holy Cross Crusaders football team was an American football team that represented the College of the Holy Cross during the 1989 NCAA Division I-AA football season. Holy Cross swept its conference and won its third Colonial League championship in four years.

In their fourth year under head coach Mark Duffner, the Crusaders compiled a 10–1 record. Tim Donovan, Randy Pedro, Chris Maruca and Dave Murphy were the team captains.

The Crusaders outscored opponents 396 to 161. Holy Cross' undefeated (4–0) conference record placed first in the five-team Colonial League standings.

The Crusaders started the year at No. 8 in the national Division I-AA rankings and reached as high as No. 3. They were ranked No. 4 at season's end but did not participate in the national championship playoffs, as Colonial League rules at the time prohibited postseason play. 

Holy Cross played its home games at Fitton Field on the college campus in Worcester, Massachusetts.

Schedule

References

Holy Cross
Holy Cross Crusaders football seasons
Patriot League football champion seasons
Holy Cross Crusaders football